Withchers Island is a bar island on the Kanawha River between the towns of Belle and Chesapeake in Kanawha County, West Virginia.

See also 
List of islands of West Virginia

River islands of West Virginia
Islands of Kanawha County, West Virginia
Kanawha River